Robert Koren (born 20 September 1980) is a Slovenian former professional footballer who played as a midfielder. Koren earned 61 caps and scored five goals for the Slovenia national team between 2003 and 2011 and played at the 2010 FIFA World Cup. Besides Slovenia, he has played in Norway, England, and Australia.

Club career

Early career
Koren played for Dravograd and Celje in his home country, before transferring to Norwegian side Lillestrøm in 2004.

Lillestrøm
He became one of the most highly rated players of the Norwegian Premier League, many regarding him as the best foreigner in the entire competition. Koren was the definitive playmaker for Lillestrøm, and has often been compared to his former idol Zlatko Zahovič. During his time in Norway he was linked with a move to English club Leeds United.

West Bromwich Albion
On 4 January 2007, Koren signed for English Championship club West Bromwich Albion in a Bosman ruling, penning an 18-month contract with a further year's option in the club's favour. He made his debut two days later as a late substitute in the Baggies' 3–1 win over Leeds United in the FA Cup third round. Koren scored his first goal for the club in a 7–0 home win against Barnsley on 6 May 2007, the last day of the league season. The victory ensured Albion's place in the Championship promotion play-offs. Koren started all three play-off games as Albion beat Wolves in the two-legged semi-final but lost 1–0 to Derby County in the Wembley final.

In July 2007 Koren suffered a freak accident in training when a ball hit him in the eye, causing internal bleeding and temporary loss of vision. Although he made a full recovery, he later admitted that he had feared for his sight. The injury meant that he missed the start of the 2007–08 season, but he returned to the side at the end of August as a substitute in a League Cup game against Peterborough. In mid-September he signed a new two-year contract at Albion, with a further year's option in the club's favour. He has been described by former West Brom manager Tony Mowbray as a "model pro". Koren's two goals in Albion's 3–2 defeat away at Southampton in October 2007 earned him a place in the Championship Team of the Week. Koren scored his first Premier League goal on 17 January 2009 and was named man of the match as Albion beat Middlesbrough 3–0. His goal in Albion's 2–2 draw with Burnley in the FA Cup earned him the ITV goal of the round. In the 2008–09 Premier League season, Koren proved his reliability and consistency by making the most appearances of the season for an outfield player at West Brom, only appearing fewer times than goalkeeper Scott Carson.  On 17 May 2010, Koren was released by West Bromwich Albion after the club chose not to take up their option to extend his contract.

Hull City

On 13 August 2010, he joined Hull City on a free transfer. He signed a two-year contract, with an option of a third year, just after the start of the season following their relegation from the Premier League with one game of the Football League Championship already played. He made his debut for the club when he came on as a replacement for Will Atkinson at Millwall on 14 August 2010. He scored his first goal for the club in a 2–0 home victory over Derby County on 14 September 2010. He also scored goals away at Norwich City and Leicester City and scored a 25-yard strike at home to Ipswich Town, and also scored what proved to be the winning goal in a 2–1 away victory over Watford. On 17 September 2011 against Portsmouth at the KC Stadium, Koren picked up possession, picked his spot and fired home into the bottom corner from 25 yards.

On 24 September 2011, against Bristol City at Ashton Gate Stadium, Koren played a neat ball into Aaron McLean's feet and when the pass was returned, Koren stroked a lovely low shot into the bottom corner of the net. On 22 October 2011 against Watford at the KC Stadium, Koren picked up possession midway inside the City half, drifted past three Watford players before driving home into the bottom corner of the net from 25 yards. On 29 November 2011, against Southampton at St Mary's Stadium, a flowing move down the left ended with Tom Cairney pulling the ball back to Koren, whose shot deflected off Matty Fryatt and brought a stunning save out of Kelvin Davis. But the rebound fell for Koren, who nodded home from close range. On 3 December 2011, against Leicester City at the KC Stadium, the ball was rolled nicely into the path of Koren and he struck a beautiful shot past Schmeichel from 20 yards. On 7 December 2011, against Birmingham City at the KC Stadium, Cameron Stewart got to the byeline down the right before firing in a vicious cross that was only cleared as far as the penalty spot where Koren readjusted his body to volley into the net. On 17 December 2011, against Millwall at the KC Stadium, a long ball forward was headed down by a Millwall defender and it dropped nicely for Koren, who adjusted his feet well before firing home a low shot from 20 yards out.

On 11 August 2012, he signed a new two-year contract. On 15 September 2012, against Millwall at the KC Stadium, Koren picked up possession on the edge of the centre circle, advanced unchallenged before unleashing a powerful drive from 25 yards which flew past Taylor and into the net. After Hull's promotion to Premier League he was ruled out for four to five weeks for  foot injury before the clash against Newcastle United.

Melbourne City
On 3 August 2014, Robert Koren was announced as a marquee signing for Melbourne City in the A-League. After missing the first 10 games of the season with injury, on 20 December 2014 Koren made his debut in the Melbourne Derby, coming on as a substitute. On 30 December 2014, Koren scored a hat trick against Newcastle Jets in his first starting game. On 21 January 2016, he was released from his contract to pursue new opportunities.

Personal life
Koren is married and has two sons and a daughter, Nal, Tian and Nia Koren.

Career statistics

International 

Scores and results list Slovenia's goal tally first, score column indicates score after each Koren goal.

Honours
West Bromwich Albion
 Football League Championship: 2007–08

Hull City
 Football League Championship: runner-up 2012–13
 FA Cup: Runner-up 2013–14

Individual
 Kniksen Award: Midfielder of the year in 2006
 Hull City Player of the season and goal of the season 2011–12

References

External links

 Player profile at NZS 
 

1980 births
Living people
Slovenian footballers
People from the Municipality of Radlje ob Dravi
Association football midfielders
NK Dravograd players
NK Celje players
Lillestrøm SK players
West Bromwich Albion F.C. players
Hull City A.F.C. players
Melbourne City FC players
Slovenian expatriate footballers
Slovenian expatriate sportspeople in Norway
Expatriate footballers in Norway
Slovenian expatriate sportspeople in England
Expatriate footballers in England
Slovenian expatriate sportspeople in Australia
Expatriate soccer players in Australia
Slovenian Second League players
Slovenian PrvaLiga players
Eliteserien players
English Football League players
Premier League players
A-League Men players
Marquee players (A-League Men)
Kniksen Award winners
Slovenia youth international footballers
Slovenia under-21 international footballers
Slovenia international footballers
2010 FIFA World Cup players
Slovenian football managers